Sutton Downtown Historic District is a national historic district located at Sutton, Braxton County, West Virginia. It encompasses 85 contributing buildings and two contributing structures covering eleven square blocks.  The district includes the commercial, ecclesiastical, and civic core of the town and surrounding residential area.  The district includes a number of buildings representative of popular architectural styles from the late-19th century and early-20th century including Romanesque Revival, Colonial Revival, Gothic Revival, and Greek Revival. Notable buildings include the Braxton County Courthouse (1881-1882) and Jail (1905), Sutton Bank Building (1891), Farmers Bank and Trust (1909), Bank of Sutton (c. 1900), Methodist Episcopal Church, South (1896), Kelly / Fisher House (c. 1870). Elk / Midway Hotel (1894), and Katie B. Frame Residence (c. 1880).  The two structures are the Bridge over Old Woman Run (1892) and Bridge over Elk (1930).

It was listed on the National Register of Historic Places in 1987.

References

National Register of Historic Places in Braxton County, West Virginia
Historic districts in Braxton County, West Virginia
Romanesque Revival architecture in West Virginia
Colonial Revival architecture in West Virginia
Gothic Revival architecture in West Virginia
Greek Revival architecture in West Virginia
Houses in Braxton County, West Virginia
Houses on the National Register of Historic Places in West Virginia
Commercial buildings on the National Register of Historic Places in West Virginia
Historic districts on the National Register of Historic Places in West Virginia